The 1996 Malaysian motorcycle Grand Prix was the first round of the 1996 Grand Prix motorcycle racing season. It took place on 31 March 1996 at the Shah Alam Circuit. This race marked the debut of a young Italian rider and future Grand Prix motorcycle racing legend Valentino Rossi in the 125cc class.

500 cc classification

250 cc classification

125 cc classification

External links

References

Malaysian motorcycle Grand Prix
Malaysia
Motorcycle Grand Prix